Smolice may refer to the following places:
Smolice, Lesser Poland Voivodeship (south Poland)
Smolice, Łęczyca County in Łódź Voivodeship (central Poland)
Smolice, Zgierz County in Łódź Voivodeship (central Poland)
Smolice, Greater Poland Voivodeship (west-central Poland)
Smolice, Opole Voivodeship (south-west Poland)